The Rostock University of Music and Theatre (short HMT, Hochschule für Musik und Theater Rostock in German) is a  college of music in Rostock, Mecklenburg, Germany. It opened in 1994 and is situated in a former abbey called Katharinenkloster in the historical core of the city. The college is a member of the Association of Baltic Academies of Music.

History 
In 1947, a University of Music, Theatre and Dance was inaugurated in Rostock under the direction of the composer Rudolf Wagner-Régeny. In 1978, it became a branch of the Hans Eisler University of Music in Berlin and was directed by Professor Karl-Heinz Will up until 1990.
After the political revolution of 1989, this branch was incorporated into the university as the department of musical science. 

The Drama College (Rostocker Schauspielschule) was founded in 1968 as the state drama school in Rostock, which in the 80s was turned into a branch of the "Ernst Busch" Academy of Dramatic Art in Berlin. By the turn of 1990/91, the college became the Academy of Dramatic Art of Mecklenburg-Vorpommern, a German federal state, and was temporarily continued as the drama department of the University of Rostock. 

The University of Music and Theatre in Rostock was legally established by the government of Mecklenburg-West Pomerania on January 1, 1994. The founding rector was Professor Wilfrid Jochims from the University of Music in Cologne. Today, the Rostock University of Music and Theatre is a favourite choice among students throughout Europe. Since June 2004, Prof. Christfried Göckeritz has been the rector of the University. 

The first accommodation was in a former school at Bussebart and at the Ulmenstraße, which soon revealed to be very small for the increasing number of students. Since its move in 2001 into the beautifully restored Katharinenstift, made by architect Jons Reimann, the University of Music and Theatre has become a noticed venue for concerts, plays and events. Students and lecturers of the University stage over 300 performances every year for the Rostock public.

The actor, painter and writer Armin Mueller-Stahl is since 2009 part of the direction of this University.

Courses of Studies 

 Bachelor of Music (Wind instruments, Voice (all specialities), Guitar, Harp, Piano, Composition, Coaching music theatre, Music theory, Orchestral conducting, Pop and world music (instrumental), Pop and world music (vocal), Percussion, Strings)
 Master of Music (Voice, Chamber Music, Composition, Coaching, Music theory (with focus on New Music), Orchestra, Orchestral conducting, Artistic training (Piano, Guitar, Piano Duo))
 Music Education for General Schools
 Pop | World music
 Acting
 Performing Arts

Alumni 
 Susanne Bormann (born 1979), actress
 Caspar Frantz (born 1980), pianist
 Claudia Graue (born 1981), actress
 Pauline Knof (born 1980), actress
 Karl Kranzkowski (born 1953), actor
 Liv Migdal (born 1988), violinist
 Stefan Mocker (born 1972), actor
 Anne Moll (born 1966), actress
 Wanda Perdelwitz (born 1984), actress
 Anne Ratte-Polle (born 1974), actress
 Nadja Robiné (born 1980), actress
 Katrin Sass (born 1956), actress
 Daniela Schober (born 1977), actress
 Baiba Skride (born 1981), violinist
 Ines Thomas Almeida (born 1982), ainger
 Teresa Weißbach (born 1981), actress
 Jing Xiang (born 1993), actress

External links 

 
Music schools in Germany
Public universities
Education in Rostock
1994 establishments in Germany
Educational institutions established in 1994
Universities and colleges in Mecklenburg-Western Pomerania